"Life Changes" is a song recorded by American country music singer Thomas Rhett. It was released to country radio on April 16, 2018 via Valory Music Group as the fourth single from his third studio album, Life Changes (2017). The song was written by Rhett, along with his father Rhett Akins, Ashley Gorley and Jesse Frasure.

Background
"Life Changes" was released as the fourth single on Rhett's third studio album, Life Changes, on April 16, 2018. The song was originally released as the third promotional single for the album.

Rhett discussed the autobiographical song with Taste of Country:

The song is covered with "slick production and Rhett's slowed talking/singing style." He speaks about how his life has evolved over the years of his life and how he would never want a thing to change.

The radio edit features a lyric change reflecting the birth of Ada James. The line in the third verse where Rhett sings, "Now Lauren's showing, got one on the way" is altered to "Now there's Willa, and sweet Ada James."

Commercial performance
The song has sold 189,000 copies in the United States as of October 2018.

Music video
A static video with the original lyrics was released on August 31, 2017. The official music video with the radio edit lyrics was released on July 10, 2018. The video features his wife Lauren and two daughters Willa and Ada James on tour, along with him performing with his band on stage.

Charts

Weekly charts

Year-end charts

Certifications

References

2018 songs
2018 singles
Thomas Rhett songs
Big Machine Records singles
Songs written by Rhett Akins
Songs written by Jesse Frasure
Songs written by Ashley Gorley
Songs written by Thomas Rhett
Song recordings produced by Dann Huff